Pressure Cooker is a nine piece reggae/ska/rocksteady band from Boston. The group writes, records, and performs original songs in the styles of 1960s and 1970s Jamaican music. The group formed in 1997.

Pressure Cooker has released seven full-length CDs. Fronted by lead singer Craig Akira Fujita and backed by a core of Boston-area musicians, the band has played to audiences at clubs and festivals spanning from New England to Chicago. Over the years, Pressure Cooker has opened locally for notable artists of roots reggae music including Toots & the Maytals, Burning Spear, Gregory Isaacs, The Wailers, Prince Buster, Derrick Morgan, The Skatalites, Culture, Laurel Aitken, Eek-A-Mouse, Julian Marley, and Sister Carol.

Their newest recording, Wherever You Go, was released in December 2012 and funded through Kickstarter.

Line up
Craig Akira Fujita - vocals
Michael O'Connor - tenor saxophone
Brian Thomas - trombone
Jeffrey Eckman - drums
Dan Hawkins - bass
Adam Dobkowski - guitar
Zack Brines - keyboards
Robin Teague - tenor saxophone
Louisa Bram - trumpet

Discography
Pressure Cooker S/T - 1999
I Want to Tell You - 2001
Committed - 2003
Burning Fence - 2004
Future's History - 2006
What She Wants - 2009
Wherever You Go - 2012

References

External links
Pressure Cooker Official Homepage

American ska musical groups